Tarakeswar (pronounced Tarokeshwar) is a famous sacred city and a municipality in Hooghly district in the Indian state of West Bengal. Tarakeswar is called "Babar Dham" or "The city of  Shiva". It is one of the major tourist and holy place of West Bengal as well as India. Tarakeswar can be reached conveniently by Train and Bus from various places of West Bengal. Tarakeswar Station is well connected by Howrah Station. This city is also famous for agriculture, Tarakeswar's (Especially Champandanga) potato is also famous in all over India.

Geography

Location
It has an average elevation of 18 metres (59 feet).
It is in the Chandannagore sub-division, in the middle of the district, in Hooghly District of Burdwan Division in the state of West Bengal. The town is connected both by railway and State Highway. The town is 48 km from Chinsurah, the district headquarter and 45 km from Chandannagore, the Sub-Divisional Headquarter and 58 km from Kolkata, the state capital by railway (BG). It is also connected with other urban centers of district with motorable roads.

Climate 
Tarakeswar has a tropical wet and dry climate under Köppen climate classification.

Pollution Level 
Tarakeswar has been ranked No.1 as the least polluted cities in Central and South Asia  achieved annual PM2.5 concentrations in 2022 that met WHO Guidelines. The PM2.5 level of Tarakeswar was 0.9 as of 2022 report.

Area and Administrative boundary 

The Tarakeswar Municipality area is divided into 15 wards for administrative purposes. Tarakeswar town is situated in the center of Tarakeswar Block. Four Gram Panchayats surround this Municipality. North portion of this town is Bhanjipur Gram Panchayat, south portion is Ramnagar Gram Panchayat, east portion is Baligori (1) Gram Panchayat and west portion is Santoshpur Gram Panchayat.

Administrative set up 
Tarakeswar is in the Chandannagore Sub-Division under the Burdwan Division in the District of Hooghly. It is also under the Tarakeswar Police Station. It received the status of Municipality on 6 August 1975.

Police station
Tarakeswar police station has jurisdiction over Tarakeswar municipal areas and Tarakeswar CD Block.

CD Block HQ
The headquarters of Tarakeswar CD Block are located at Tarakeswar.

Demographics 
As per 2011 Census of India, Tarakeswar had a total population of 30,947 of which 16,049 (52%) were males and 14,898 (48%) were females. Population below 6 years was 2,685. The total number of literates in Tarakeswar was 23,711 (83.90% of the population over 6 years).

 India census, Tarakeswar had a population of 28,178. Males constitute 53% of the population (i.e., 14,986) and females 47% (i.e., 13,192). The Sex ratio (i.e. number of female per 1000 males) of population is 880. In Tarakeswar, 10% of the population is under 6 years of age. The gross density of population is 7262 person per km2. 
Tarakeswar has an average literacy rate of 72%, higher than the national average of 59.5%: male literacy is 78%, and female literacy is 66%.

Out of a total population of 30,947, 93.22% were Hindu, 4.97% were Muslim while other religions and atheism comprised the rest.

Economy 
The main occupation of the town is agriculture. Trade and commerce also play an important role.

Approximately 32 lakh people from the city commute to Kolkata daily for work. In the Howrah-Tarakeswar section there are 38 trains that carry commuters from 21 railway stations.

Taraknath Temple 
Taraknath Temple is a famous Hindu shrine located in the town of Tarakeswar in Hooghly district of West Bengal, India. The temple enshrines a Shayambhu linga of Lord Shiva. The temple is believed to be constructed in 1729 AD by Raja Bharamalla Rao.

Pilgrims visit the Taraknath Temple throughout the year, especially on Mondays. Thousands of pilgrims visit Tarakeswar on the occasions of Shravani Mela, on the month of July–August (Srabon in Bengali calendar) and Gajan.
To begin with, Vishnudas, a resident of Uttar Pradesh, native of the Tarakeswar temple, is a Shiva devotee. He came from Uttar Pradesh and started living in Hooghly.

The temple is named after Tarakeswara form of Mahadev. This temple has been repaired and rebuilt many times. Mallaraja renovated the temple in 1729. An Atchala temple. At present the temple as said, is being built by Mallarajai.
Taraknath Mandir was built in an ‘Atchala’ structure of Bengal temple architecture with a ‘natmandir’ in front. The temple features four roofs above the sanctum and extended galleries for the congregation of the devotees. Dudhpukur pond, located north of the temple, is believed to fulfill the prayers of those taking a dip in it. The temple is also claimed to be one of the Jyothirlinga shrines of Mahadev.

Each year between July and August (on the eve of the month of Shrawan) in Tarakeswar Yatra held, nearly 10 million devotees come from various part of India bringing holy water of Ganga from Nimai Tirtha Ghat of Baidyabati, which is almost 39 km (25 mi) from Tarakeswar, in order to offer it to Lord Shiva. During that month, a line of people in saffron-dyed clothes stretches over the full 39 km (25 mi). It is the longest and largest Mela of West Bengal.

Education
The town has 3 higher secondary schools, 1 secondary school, 14 primary schools out of which six are Govt. sanctioned and 8 private school. There are also one college, 3 Shishu Shikha Centre, 2 Branch centers of Open University and Open School and, one Vocational Education & Training Centre.
Primary schools in the town are Vidyamandir, Girindra Prathamik Vidyalaya, Hindi School, Anandamarg Primary School, Ramkrishna Vidyamandir, Sishu Niketan, Ankur, Bhanjipur SSK, Children's Aim, Scarlet Academy, Sahapur Primary School. The high schools are Tarakeswar High School (Boys), Tarkeswar Girls' School, Bikash Bharati Blooms Day School, Kendriya Vidyalaya, and Tarakeswar Mahavidyalaya (H.S. unit).

Tarakeswar Degree College was established at Tarakeswar in 1986. It is affiliated with the University of Burdwan and offers honours courses in Bengali, English, Sanskrit, sociology, history, philosophy, geography, music, accountancy, chemistry and computer science. It has an undergraduate course in business administration.

Transport
Road Transport:

State Highway 15 & State Highway 2 passes through Tarakeswar. Tarakeswar has 45.493 km road out of which 13.436 km is bituminous Road, 10.483 km is concrete, 11.801 km is brick pavement; 1.857 km is Bats-Moorum roads and 7.914 km Kancha Road.

Bus : The largest bus terminus of Hooghly district situated in Tarakeswar. More than 50 bus routes present from Tarakeswar including express and local bus service. Tarakeswar has bus connection with several districts of West Bengal. Express Buses bound Bankura, Bishnupur, Barddhaman, Durgapur, Bolpur, Khatra, Kharagpur, Digha, Howrah, Medinipur, Mecheda, Memari, Haldia, Panskura, Jhargram, Katwa, Krishnanagar, Nabadwip, Kalna and many more destination are available from Tarakeswar bus stand. Frequent long distance bus service available between Tarakeswar and Bankura, Bardhaman, Medinipur, Nabadwip, Ghatal. There is also many local bus route like 12, 13, 16, 17, 20, 22, 23 from Tarakeswar that covers Hooghly and some other districts. Many mini bus routes like Tarakeswar - Bargachiya, Tarakeswar - Khusiganj, Tarakeswar - Udaynarayanpur etc are also present.

Rail Transport:

The town has a status of Model Station of Eastern Railway. The distance between Howrah and Tarakeswar is 58 km. It serves as a transportation center for potato and other green vegetables in the southern Bengal.

The Howrah-Tarakeswar line was opened in 1885. Tarakeswar railway station was also a terminal for the Bengal Provincial Railway. It is part of the Kolkata Suburban Railway system. Tarakeswar Railway Station is declared as a Multifunctional Station. Tarakeswar railway station is one of the most important station of Eastern Railway. The present Railway Line between Sheoraphuli railway station and Tarakeswar has been extended to Bishnupur in Bankura. Tarakeswar Railway station Enquiry number is: 03212276190. There are also many new rail projects from Tarakeswar. Those projects are Tarakeswar - Dhaniakhali - Magra Line, Tarakeswar - Champadanga - Amta - Bagnan Line, Tarakeswar - Baruipara line etc.

Communication

Champadanga area Telephone Exchange with dialling code 03212 serves: Begampur, Bhagabatipur, Champadanga, Chanditala, Dihi-batpur, Dwarhatta, Piyasara, Gopinagar, Haripal, Harinkhola, Jangipara, Jinpur, Dulalbati, Mashat, Nalikul, Rajbalahat, Shaympur, Pratiharpur, Loknath, Tarakeswar, Talpur, Taukipur and Mayapur. WCDMA and LTE network are also available here.

See also
 Tarakeswar affair
 Tarakeswar Municipality
 Taraknath Temple, Tarakeswar, West Bengal
 tarakeswar.in
 Tarakeswar App

Cities and towns in Hooghly district